Caulophryne polynema is a species of fish in the family Caulophrynidae, the fanfins. It is known commonly as the hairy fanfin. It is native to the Atlantic and eastern Pacific Oceans. It occurs off the eastern coast of North America across to Africa and as far north as Iceland. In the Pacific it is known from the waters off of Hawaii and to the western coast of North America.

This is a species of anglerfish. As in many anglerfishes, the female is much larger than the male. The female may reach over 14 centimeters in length, while the male reaches about 1.6 centimeters. As in many anglerfishes, the male attaches to the female as a parasite. This species has a long, filamentous illicium, the "fishing lure" of the anglerfishes, which is tipped with a bulb called an esca which it can illuminate.

This is a deep-water species living at depths of 900 to 1250 meters.

References

Caulophrynidae
Deep sea fish
Fish described in 1930
Taxa named by Charles Tate Regan